Lorrayne Gracie-Safiruddin (born 3 March 1964) is a British former professional tennis player.

Born in 1964, Gracie started playing tennis at the age of 10 while growing up in Cheshire and attended Culcheth Hall School. Her father Malcolm was also a tennis player, but is better known as a former president of the Lawn Tennis Association.

Gracie competed on the professional tour in the 1980s and featured on several occasions in the qualifying or main draws at Wimbledon. She reached the third qualifying round in 1985, beating future finalist Nathalie Tauziat en route. All of her main draw appearances at Wimbledon came in doubles.

ITF finals

Doubles: 8 (0–8)

References

External links
 
 

1964 births
Living people
British female tennis players
English female tennis players
Tennis people from Cheshire
20th-century British women